John Moore II of Dover, Kent, was an English politician.

He was a Member of Parliament (MP) for Dover in 1584 and 1586.

References

Year of birth missing
Year of death missing
Members of the Parliament of England for Dover
English MPs 1584–1585
English MPs 1586–1587